Mavueni is a neighborhood in the city of Kilifi, in Kenya's Kilifi County.

Location
The coordinates of Mavueni are: 3°37'24.0"S, 39°50'57.0"E (Latitude:-3.623329; Longitude:39.849166).

Overview
Mavueni is a mixed residential-commercial neighborhood, hosting the main campus of Pwani University, warehouses of Mavueni Enterprises Limited, a branch of Tuskys Supermarkets, Kilifi County Hospital and Mavueni Primary School. As the city of Kilifi expands and as the population increases, the area has seen increasing land disputes.

See also
 List of roads in Kenya
 Pwani University

References

External links
 About the town of Kilifi, circa 2000

Populated places in Kilifi County
Kilifi